The 1934 college football season was the 66th season of college football in the United States. Two New Year's Day bowl games were initiated to rival the Rose Bowl Game. On February 15, Warren V. Miller and Joseph M. Cousins organized the New Orleans Mid-Winter Sports Association and by October, the group had enough funds to sponsor the Sugar Bowl. Meanwhile, W. Keith Phillips and the Greater Miami Athletic Club worked in November at a January 1 game for Florida, and the Orange Bowl was created.

Once again, University of Illinois Professor Frank Dickinson's math system selected a Big Ten team as national champion, the undefeated Minnesota Golden Gophers. William Boand and Professor Edward Earl Litkenhous also selected Minnesota at the end of the season. The conference, however, still had a bar against its members playing in the postseason, so Minnesota did not play in any of the bowl games. The undefeated and eventual Rose Bowl champion Alabama Crimson Tide was selected as national champion by the other contemporary math system selectors, Dick Dunkel, Paul Williamson and Deke Houlgate.

Conference realignment

Membership changes

September
September 22 Stanford opened with a 48–0 win over San Jose State, while in Houston, Rice opened with a 12–0 win over Loyola College of New Orleans.
 
September 29 Minnesota beat North Dakota State 56–12 and Illinois beat Bradley 40–7.
Alabama beat Samford 24–0, and Tulane beat UT-Chattanooga 41–0.  Rice and LSU played to a 9–9 tie while Stanford and Santa Clara tied 7–7.
Navy defeated William & Mary 20–7 while Pittsburgh beat Washington & Jefferson 26–6.

October

October 6
Minnesota beat Nebraska, 20–0, in Minneapolis. Alabama beat Sewanee, 35–6, in Montgomery Alabama. Illinois beat Washington University, 12–7, in St. Louis. Navy beat Virginia 21–6 in a game in Washington, DC.  In New Orleans, Tulane beat Auburn 13–0. At Portland, Stanford beat Oregon State 17–0. Columbia opened its season in New York with a 12–6 win over Yale, and Colgate beat St. Lawrence 32–0.  Pittsburgh won at West Virginia 27–6.  Ohio State beat Indiana 33–0. Rice won at Purdue 14–0.

October 13 Illinois beat Ohio State 14–13.  
Stanford beat visiting Northwestern 20–0.  Pittsburgh defeated visiting USC 20–6.  Alabama defeated Mississippi State 41–0, Rice defeated SMU 9–0, and Tulane won at Florida 28–12.
Navy defeated Maryland 16–13, Colgate beat St. Bonaventure 62–0 and Columbia beat VMI 29–6.

October 20 Minnesota won at Pittsburgh, 13–7.  Ohio State defeated visiting Colgate 10–7.  Navy beat Columbia 18–7.  Alabama and Tennessee, both 3–0–0, met in Birmingham, with Bama winning 13–6.  Tulane edged visiting Georgia 7–6.  In Omaha, Rice beat Creighton University 47–13.
Stanford beat USF at San Francisco, 3–0.

October 27 Alabama beat Georgia 26–6 at Birmingham, while in New Orleans, Tulane beat Georgia Tech 20–12.  Rice stayed unbeaten with a 20–9 win over visiting Texas.  Minnesota won at Iowa 48–12, .
Illinois won at Michigan 7–6, and Ohio State won at Northwestern 28–6.  Stanford registered its fourth shutout, a 16–0 win over USC.
Navy won at Penn, Colgate won at Holy Cross 20–7 and Columbia beat visiting Penn State 14–7.  Pittsburgh beat host school Westminster College of Pennsylvania, 30–0

November
November 3 Pitt (4–1–0) and Notre Dame (3–0–0) met in Pittsburgh, with the Panthers winning 19–0.  Minnesota beat Michigan 34–0.  In Cleveland, Ohio State won at Western Reserve 76–0. Illinois beat Army 7–0.  Alabama won at Kentucky 34–14.  Rice beat Texas A&I 27–0.  Tulane beat Ole Miss 15–0. In Los Angeles, Stanford beat UCLA 27–0.  
Columbia defeated Cornell 14–0 and Navy beat Washington & Lee 26–0.

November 10 At Yankee Stadium, Tulane (6–0–0) faced Colgate (3–1–0), with the Red Raiders handing the Green Wave their first loss, 20–6.  In a meeting of unbeaten teams, Stanford (7–0–1) hosted Washington (4–0–0) and had a sixth straight shutout 24–0.    Over in Cleveland, Navy beat Notre Dame 10–6.  Pittsburgh won at Nebraska 25–6. 
Minnesota beat Indiana 30–0, Illinois won at Northwestern 14–3, and Ohio State beat Chicago 33–0
Alabama beat Clemson 40–0 and Rice won at Arkansas 7–0.  Columbia beat Brown 39–0

November 17 Navy (7–0–0) hosted Pittsburgh (6–1–0) and lost 31–7

Minnesota beat Chicago 35–7 and Ohio State defeated Michigan 34–0.  Previously unbeaten (6–0–0) Illinois was upset at Madison when it faced a (3–3–0) Wisconsin Badgers team, falling 7–3.
Alabama defeated Georgia Tech 40–0, while Tulane won at Kentucky 20–7.  Stanford beat the Olympic Club team 40–0, and had a record of 192–7 against its opponents to that time.  Colgate won at Syracuse 13–2 and Columbia edged Penn 13–12.  Rice beat Texas A&M 25–6.  Yale's 11 "Iron Men" (they played the entire game with no substitutions) upset Princeton 7–0 at Princeton.

November 24
Minnesota won at Wisconsin 34–0, Ohio State beat Iowa 40–7, and 
Illinois won at Chicago 7–1.  Stanford clinched a trip to the Rose Bowl with a 9–7 win at California.  Colgate beat Rutgers 14–0.  Tulane beat Sewanee 32–0.  Columbia (7–1–0) beat Syracuse (6–1–0) in a Sunday game 12–0.  In Houston, previously unbeaten (8–0–1) Rice hosted (6–3–0) Texas Christian (TCU) and was upset, 7–2.

On Thanksgiving Day, November 29, Alabama beat Vanderbilt in Birmingham, 34–0, and was invited soon after to meet Stanford at the Rose Bowl.  Pittsburgh beat crosstown rival Carnegie Tech, 20–0, and Kansas State beat Nebraska 19–7 to clinch the Big Six Conference championship.

December
December 1  
In Louisiana, Tulane (8–1–0) and LSU (6–0–2) faced each other in Baton Rouge.  Both teams were likely hosts for the first Sugar Bowl in New Orleans, and Tulane edged the Tigers 13–12 to become the host team, where it would face 7–0–2 Temple University.
Rice ended at 9–1–1 with a 32–0 win at Baylor.
Colgate closed its season with a 20–13 win in Providence against Brown.  At the Army–Navy Game, held in Philadelphia, Navy (7–1–0) beat Army (7–2–0) on a field goal, 3–0.

Conference standings

Eastern

Midwestern

Southern

Western

Minor conference champions

AP Poll and the Dickinson rankings
The first ever published AP Poll came in 1934. However, this was a one time event and the AP sportswriters' poll did not begin continuous publication until 1936. Frank G. Dickinson, an economics professor at the University of Illinois, had invented the Dickinson System to rank colleges based upon their records and the strength of their opposition.  The Rissman Trophy, and later the Rockne Memorial Trophy, was awarded to the winning university.

In an AP story with the caption "Figure This Out!", the system was explained:
"For each victory of a first division team over another first division team, the winner gets 30 points and the loser 15 points.  For each tie between two first
division teams, each team gets 22.5 points.  For each victory of a first division team over a second division team, the first division winner gets 20 points and the second division loser 10 points.  For each tie between two second
division teams, each gets 15 points.  For each tie between a first division team and a second division team, the first division team gets 15 points and the second division
team gets 20 points.  Then, after each team has been given its quota of points its final "score" is tabulated by taking an average on the number of games played."

Final Dickinson rankings
Minnesota (8–0) and Alabama (9–0) were both unbeaten and untied, and ranked first and sixth, respectively, in the Dickinson ratings.

Bowl games

 played with non-collegiate teams
Rankings from the Dickinson System

In the first Sugar Bowl game, Tulane (9–1) hosted unbeaten Temple (7–0–2) before a crowd of 30,000 in New Orleans.  Temple took a 14–0 lead before Tulane came back to win the game, 20–14.  Temple had closed its season with a scoreless tie against Bucknell, which finished at 6–2–2, and the Bison were invited to play the Miami Hurricanes in the first Orange Bowl.  The 'Canes best days were still ahead of them, and they made only three first downs altogether.  Although 15,000 were expected, only 5,000 turned out to watch Bucknell beat Miami, 26–0.

The big game remained the Rose Bowl with Stanford, at 9–0–1, and Alabama, at 9–0. With both teams unbeaten, a crowd of 85,000 turned out in Pasadena to watch them.  Stanford led 7–0 in the first quarter, but Alabama scored 22 points in the second, with the help of quarterback Dixie Howell and future Pro Football Hall of Fame Don Hutson, with Alabama winning, 29–14.
The Sun Bowl was given a test drive with non-collegiate teams, as the El Paso All-Stars beating the visiting Ranger Bulldogs, 25–21, before a crowd of 3,000 in El Paso.  In Honolulu, the Hawaii team beat vacationing California, 14–0, and in Houston,  beat Prairie View, 15–6, in a New Year's Day game for negro colleges

Awards and honors

All-Americans
The consensus 1934 College Football All-America Team included:

Statistical leaders
 Points scored: Bill Shepherd, Western Maryland, 133
 Total offense: Dixie Howell, Alabama, 1,437
 Receptions: Don Hutson, Alabama, 19

References